Duygu Çete (born April 19, 1989, in Gümüşhane, Turkey) is a Turkish female visually impaired judoka (disability class B3) competing in the -57 kg division. She won the bronze medal at the 2012 Paralympics.

Career history
She represented her country at the 2008 Summer Paralympics in Athens, Greece without advancing to the finals. In 2008, Duygu Çete took a bronze medal at the European Championship in Hungary and another bronze medal at the International Tournament in Germany. The next year, she won the silver medal at the International Tournament in Germany. At the World Championship held 2010 in Antalya, Turkey, she ranked third and her team became silver medalist at the World Championships in Antalya the same year. Çete won a silver medal at the European Championship in London in 2011.

Achievements

References

1989 births
Living people
Sportspeople from Gümüşhane
Turkish female judoka
Paralympic judoka of Turkey
Judoka at the 2012 Summer Paralympics
Paralympic bronze medalists for Turkey
Visually impaired category Paralympic competitors
Judoka at the 2008 Summer Paralympics
Izmir Büyükşehir Belediyespor athletes
Medalists at the 2012 Summer Paralympics
Paralympic medalists in judo
20th-century Turkish sportswomen
21st-century Turkish sportswomen
Turkish blind people